Mountview is a property in Brentwood, Tennessee that was built in 1860 and that was listed on the National Register of Historic Places in 1986.  It has also been known as the Davis-Rozelle Residence.

It includes Greek Revival, Italianate, "Transitional" and other architecture.

It is one of about thirty "significant brick and frame residences" surviving in Williamson County that were built during 1830 to 1860 and "were the center of large plantations " and display "some of the finest construction of the ante-bellum era."  It faces on the Franklin and Columbia Pike that ran south from Brentwood to Franklin to Columbia.

See also
Mooreland, also on the pike north of Franklin and NRHP-listed
James Johnston House, also on the pike north of Franklin and NRHP-listed
Aspen Grove, also on the pike north of Franklin and a Williamson County historic resource
Thomas Shute House, also on the pike north of Franklin and a Williamson County historic resource
Alpheus Truett House, also on the pike north of Franklin and a Williamson County historic resource

References

Houses on the National Register of Historic Places in Tennessee
Houses in Williamson County, Tennessee
Greek Revival houses in Tennessee
Italianate architecture in Tennessee
Houses completed in 1860
National Register of Historic Places in Williamson County, Tennessee